The Cameri Theater (HaTeatron HaKameri), established in 1944 in Tel Aviv, is one of the leading theaters in Israel, and is housed at the Tel Aviv Performing Arts Center.

History
The Cameri theater was founded with the purpose of promoting local theater, in contrast to Habima Theater, which had roots in Russian theater. The Cameri presented works about the daily life of persons in the fledgling state of Israel. Cameri is the theater where the Israeli nationalist play He Walked Through the Fields premiered just two weeks after the state of Israel was formally established in May 1948. He Walked Through the Fields, written by Moshe Shamir, was later adapted to film starring Moshe Dayan's youngest son Assi Dayan.

The Cameri, Tel Aviv's municipal theater, stages up to ten new productions a year, in addition to its repertoire from previous years. The theater has 34,000 subscribers and attracts 900,000 spectators annually.

In 2003, the Cameri moved into the Tel Aviv Performing Arts Center complex, adjacent to the New Israeli Opera, the Municipal Library and the Tel Aviv Museum of Art. The new theater has five auditoriums: Cameri 1, the largest auditorium, has 930 seats; Cameri 2 has 430 seats, the Black Box seats 250, and the Rehearsal Hall seats 160.

The Cameri's social action programs include the Peace Foundation, which brings together young Israelis and Palestinians to watch theater performances, and Theater in Education, which brings high school students, university students and special needs audiences to the theater. The Cameri also offers ticket subsidies for senior citizens and simultaneous translation of its productions into English, Russian and Arabic.

The director general of the Cameri, Noam Semel, founded the Institute of Israeli Drama, which promotes Israeli theater in Israel and abroad.

Awards and recognition
In 2005, the Cameri won the Israel Prize, for its lifetime achievements and special contribution to society and the State of Israel.

See also
List of Israel Prize recipients
Culture of Israel

References

External links 
Cameri theatre website
Israel Prize Official Site - CV of the Cameri Theater (in Hebrew)
Cameri Theater Archive 1944-1948 on the Digital collections of Younes and Soraya Nazarian Library, University of Haifa

Organizations established in 1944
Israel Prize recipients that are organizations
Israel Prize for lifetime achievement & special contribution to society recipients
Jewish theatres
Theatres in Tel Aviv
Theatre companies in Israel
Tourist attractions in Tel Aviv
Yaakov Rechter buildings